Payment and Settlement Systems in India are used for financial transactions. They are covered by the Payment and Settlement Systems Act of 2007 (PSS Act), legislated in December 2007 and regulated by the Reserve Bank of India and the Board for Regulation and Supervision of Payment and Settlement Systems.

India has multiple payments and settlement systems, both gross and net settlement systems. For gross settlement India has a real-time gross settlement (RTGS) system called by the same name and net settlement systems, such as Electronic Clearing Services (ECS Credit), Electronic Clearing Services (ECS Debit), credit cards, debit cards, the National Electronic Fund Transfer (NEFT) system, Immediate Payment Service and Unified Payments Interface (UPI)

The Reserve Bank of India is trying to encourage alternative methods of payments which will bring security and efficiency to the payment systems and make the whole process easier for banks.

According to a survey by Celent, the ratio of e-payments to paper-based transactions has considerably increased between 2004 and 2008. This has happened as a result of advances in technology and increasing consumer awareness of the ease and efficiency of internet and also mobile transactions.

In the case of India, the RBI has played a pivotal role in facilitating e-payments by making it compulsory for banks to route high-value transactions through real-time gross settlement (RTGS) and also by introducing NEFT (National Electronic Funds Transfer) and NECS (National Electronic Clearing Services) which has encouraged individuals and businesses to switch. India is one of the fastest-growing countries for payment cards in the Asia-Pacific region. Behavioral patterns of Indian customers are also likely to be influenced by their internet accessibility and usage, which currently is about 32 million PC users, 68% of whom have access to the Internet. However, these statistical indications are far from the reality where customers still prefer to pay "in line" rather than online, with 63% payments still being made in cash. E-payments have to be continuously promoted showing consumers the various routes through which they can make these payments like ATM's, the internet, mobile phones and drop boxes.

Due to the efforts of the RBI and the (BPSS), now over 75% of all transaction volume are in the electronic mode, including both large-value and retail payments. Out of this 75%, 98% come from the RTGS (large-value payments) whereas a meager 2% come from retail payments. This means consumers have not yet accepted this as a regular means of paying their bills and still prefer conventional methods. Retail payments if made via electronic modes are done by ECS (debit and credit), EFT and card payments. The Reserve Bank on Monday asked banks to put in place additional arrangements for export and import transactions in Indian rupees in view of increasing interest of the global trading community in the domestic currency. Before putting in place this mechanism, banks will require prior approval from the Foreign Exchange Department of the Reserve Bank of India (RBI), the central bank said in a circular.

Electronic Clearing Services (ECS Credit)
Known as "Credit-push" facility or one-to-many facility, this method is used mainly for large-value or bulk payments where the receiver's account is credited with the payment from the institution making the payment. Such payments are made on a timely basis like a year, half a year, etc. and used to pay salaries, dividends or commissions. Over time it has become one of the most convenient methods of making large payments.

Electronic Clearing Services (ECS Debit)
Known as many-to-one or "debit-pull" facility, this method is used mainly for small value payments from consumers/individuals to big organizations or companies. It eliminates the need for paper and instead makes the payment through banks/corporates or government departments. It facilitates individual payments like telephone bills, electricity bills, online and card payments and insurance payments. Though easy, this method lacks popularity because consumer awareness is important.

As mentioned above, India is one of the fastest-growing countries in the plastic money segment. Already there are 130 million cards in circulation, which is likely to increase at a very fast pace due to rampant consumerism. India's card market has been recording a growth rate of 30% in the last five years. Card payments form an integral part of e-payments in India because customers make many payments on their card-paying their bills, transferring funds and shopping.

Ever since debit cards entered India in 1998, they have been growing in number and today they consist of nearly 3/4 of the total number of cards in circulation.

Credit cards have shown a relatively slower growth even though they entered the market one decade before debit cards. Only in the last five years has there been an impressive growth in the number of credit cards—by 74.3% between 2004 and 2008. It is expected to grow at a rate of about 60% considering levels of employment and disposable income. Most credit card purchases come from expenses on jewelry, dining and shopping.

Another recent innovation in the field of plastic money is co-branded credit cards, which combine many services into one card-where banks and other retail stores, airlines, telecom companies enter into business partnerships. This increases the utility of these cards; hence they are used not only in ATMs but also at point of sale (POS) terminals and while making payments on the Internet.

Real-time gross settlement

The acronym 'RTGS' stands for Real-time gross settlement. The Reserve Bank of India (India's Central Bank) maintains this payment network. Real-time gross settlement is a funds transfer mechanism where transfer of money takes place from one bank to another on a 'real time' and on 'gross' basis. This is the fastest possible money transfer system through the banking channel. Settlement in 'real time' means payment transaction is not subjected to any waiting period. The transactions are settled as soon as they are processed. 'Gross settlement' means the transaction is settled on one to one basis without bunching with any other transaction. Considering that money transfer takes place in the books of the Reserve Bank of India, the payment is taken as final and irrevocable.

Fees for RTGS vary from bank to bank. RBI has prescribed upper limit for the fees which can be charged by all banks both for NEFT and RTGS. Both the remitting and receiving must have core banking in place to enter into RTGS transactions. Core Banking enabled banks and branches are assigned an Indian Financial System Code (IFSC) for RTGS and NEFT purposes. This is an eleven digit alphanumeric code and unique to each branch of bank. The first four letters indicate the identity of the bank and remaining seven numerals indicate a single branch. This code is provided on the cheque books, which are required for transactions along with recipient's account number.

RTGS is a large value (minimum value of transaction should be 2,00,000) funds transfer system whereby financial intermediaries can settle interbank transfers for their own account as well as for their customers. The system effects final settlement of interbank funds transfers on a continuous, transaction-by-transaction basis throughout the processing day. Customers can access the RTGS facility between 9 am to 4:30 pm (Interbank up to 6:30 pm) on weekdays and 9 am to 2:00 pm (Interbank up to 3:00 pm) on Saturdays. However, the timings that the banks follow may vary depending on the bank branch. Time-varying charges has been introduced w.e.f. 1 October 2011 by RBI. The basic purpose of RTGS is to facilitate the transactions which need immediate access for the completion of the transaction.

Banks could use balances maintained under the cash reserve ratio (CRR) and the intra-day liquidity (IDL) to be supplied by the central bank, for meeting any eventuality arising out of the real time gross settlement (RTGS). The RBI fixed the IDL limit for banks to three times their net owned fund (NOF).

The IDL will be charged at 25 per transaction entered into by the bank on the RTGS platform. The marketable securities and treasury bills will have to be placed as collateral with a margin of five per cent. However, the apex bank will also impose severe penalties if the IDL is not paid back at the end of the day.

Since 26 August 2019, the RTGS service window for customers' transactions is available from 7:00 AM to 6:00 PM from Monday to Saturday (except the second and fourth Saturday of each month). No transactions are settled on Sundays and bank holidays. The service is scheduled to become available 24 hours a day starting in December 2020.

The RBI announced on 11 June 2019 that 'all charges for payments via RTGS and National Electronic Funds Transfer (NEFT) collected from banks would be waived from 1 July 2019, and asked banks to pass on the benefits to customers.'

RTGS Timings

Service Charge for RTGS
(a) Inward transaction– no charge to be levied.

(b) Outward transactions –
- For transactions of 2 lakhs to 5 lakhs -up to 25 per transaction plus applicable Time Varying Charges (1/- to 5/-); total not exceeding 30 per transaction, (+ GST).
- Above 5 lakhs - 50 per transaction plus applicable Time Varying Charges (1/- to 5/-); total charges not exceeding 55 per transaction, (+ GST).

No time varying charges are applicable for RTGS transactions settled up to 1300 hrs.

On 6 June 2019 
To push digital transactions RBI has removed charges for payments via NEFT and RTGS and asked banks to pass on the benefits to customers. This means that payments via NEFT and RTGS would become either free or charges would be drastically reduced.

24x7 Availability of Real Time Gross Settlement (RTGS) System

In a major development, Reserve Bank of India (RBI) Governor Shaktikanta Das has confirmed that RTGS facility is now operational 24x7.

National Electronic Funds Transfer (NEFT)

Started in November 2005, the National Electronic Fund Transfer (NEFT) system is a nationwide system that facilitates individuals, firms and corporates to electronically transfer funds from any bank branch to any individual, firm or corporate having an account with any other bank branch in the country. It is done via electronic messages. Even though it is not on real time basis like RTGS (Real Time Gross Settlement), hourly batches are run in order to speed up the transactions.

For being part of the NEFT funds transfer network, a bank branch has to be NEFT-enabled. NEFT has gained popularity due to it saving on time and the ease with which the transactions can be concluded. As at 31 January 2011, 74,680 branches or offices of 101 banks in the country (out of around 82,400 bank branches) were NEFT-enabled. Steps are being taken to further widen the coverage both in terms of banks and branches offices. As on 30 December 2017 total number of NEFT enabled branches was increased to 139682 of 188 banks.

Indo-Nepal Remittance Facility Scheme
Indo-Nepal Remittance Facility is a cross-border remittance scheme to transfer funds from India to Nepal, enabled under the NEFT Scheme. The scheme was launched to provide a safe and cost-efficient avenue to migrant Nepalese workers in India to remit money back to their families in Nepal. A remitter can transfer funds up to 50,000 (maximum permissible amount) from any of the NEFT-enabled branches in India. The beneficiary would receive funds in Nepalese Rupees.

Immediate Payment Service (IMPS)

Immediate Payment Service (IMPS) is an initiative of National Payments Corporation of India (NPCI). It is a service through which money can be transferred immediately from one account to the other account, within the same bank or accounts across other banks. Upon registration, both the individuals are issued an MMID (Mobile Money Identifier) Code from their respective banks. This is a 7-digit numeric code. To initiate the transaction, the sender in his mobile banking application need to enter the registered mobile number of the receiver, MMID of the receiver and amount to be transferred. Upon successful transaction, the money gets credited in the account of the receiver instantly. This facility is available 24/7 and can be used through mobile banking application. Some banks have also started providing this service through internet banking profile of their customers. Though most banks offer this facility free of cost to encourage paperless payment system, ICICI bank and Axis bank charge for it as per their respective NEFT charges.

Money through this service can be transferred directly also by using the receiver's bank account number and IFS code. In such case, neither the receiver of the money need to be registered for mobile banking service of his bank, nor does he need MMID code. IMPS facility differs from NEFT and RTGS as there is no time limit to carry out the transaction. This facility can be availed 24/7 and on all public and bank holidays including RBI holidays.

Unified Payments Interface 

Unified Payments Interface (UPI) is an instant real-time payment system developed by National Payments Corporation of India facilitating inter-bank transactions. The interface is regulated by the Reserve Bank of India and works by instantly transferring funds between two bank accounts on a mobile platform.
The Unified Payment Interface (UPI) can be thought of like an email ID for your money. It will be a unique identifier that your bank uses to transfer money and make payments using the IMPS (Immediate Payments Service). IMPS is faster than NEFT and lets you transfer money immediately and unlike NEFT, it works 24/7. This means that the online payments will become much easier without requiring a digital wallet or credit or debit card.

Bharat Bill Payment System

Bharat Bill Payment System (BBPS) is an integrated bill payment system in India offering interoperable and accessible bill payment service to customers through a network of agents, enabling multiple payment modes, and providing instant confirmation of payment. This is still in the implementation stage. Guidelines for implementation of this system were issued on November 28, 2014.

Comparison
The key difference between RTGS and NEFT is that while RTGS is on gross settlement basis, NEFT is on net settlement basis. Besides, RTGS facilitates real-time ("push") transfer, while NEFT involves regular settlements and is operating 24/7/365 since December'2019. Customers can access the RTGS facility between 9 am to 4:30 pm on weekdays and 9 am to 1:30 pm on Saturday. RTGS would be available 24/7/365 from 00.30 hours on December 14, 2020. Round the clock availability of RTGS will provide extended flexibility to businesses for effecting payments.

RTGS facility is available in over 1,13,000 branches across India, while NEFT is available in little over 1,15,000 branches of a 100 banks.

Channels of e-payments
In their effort to enable customers to make payments the electronic way banks have developed many channels of payments viz. the internet, mobiles, ATMs and drop boxes.

The internet is one of the most popular electronic channels of payment, especially among the youth. Debit and credit payments are made by customers on various bank's websites for small purchases (retail payments) and retail transfers (ATM transfers).

ATMs serve many purposes other than functioning as terminals for withdrawals and balance inquiries, such as bill payments, applications for cheques books, and making loans.

Banks also provide telephone and mobile banking facilities. Through call agents, payments can be made and as the number of telephone and mobile subscribers are expected to rise, so is this channel of payment expected to gain popularity.

Drop boxes provide a solution to those who have no access to the internet or to a telephone or mobile. These drop-boxes are kept in the premises of banks and the customers can drop their bills along with the bill payment slips in these boxes to be collected by third party agents.

Role of the RBI in encouraging e-payments
As the top financial and regulatory institution in the country it is compulsory for the RBI to ensure that the payments system in the country is as technologically advanced as possible and in view of this aim, the RBI has taken several initiatives to strengthen the e-payments system in India and encourage people to adopt it.

Reserve Bank of India Governor Raghuram Rajan launched the Unified Payments Interface (UPI) system as an attempt to boost digital money transfers. The interface has been developed by the National Payments Corporation of India (NPCI), the umbrella organisation for all retail payments in the country.
 The Payment and Settlement Systems Act, 2007 was a major step in this direction. It enables the RBI to "regulate, supervise and lay down policies involving payment and settlement space in India." Apart from some basic instructions to banks as to the personal and confidential nature of customer payments, supervising the timely payment and settlement of all transactions, the RBI has actively encouraged all banks and consumers to embrace e-payments.
 In pursuit of the above-mentioned goal the RBI has granted NBFC’s (Non-Banking Financial Companies) the permission to issue co branded credit cards forming partnerships with commercial banks.
 The Kisan Credit Card Scheme was launched by NABARD in order to meet the credit needs of farmers, so that they can be free of paper money and use only plastic money.
 A domestic card scheme known as RuPay has recently been started by the National Payments Corporation of India, promoted by RBI and Indian Banks Association (IBA), inspired by UnionPay in China, which will be promoting the use of cards i.e.. "plastic money". Initially functioning as an NPO, RuPay will focus on potential customers from rural and semi-urban areas of India. RuPay will have a much wider coverage than Visa, MasterCard or American Express cards which have always been used for card-based settlements.
 The National Rural Employment Guarantee Scheme (NREGA) introduced by the Government will ensure rural employment in turn ensuring that the employees get wages. Each employee will have a smart card functioning as their personal identification card, driver's license, and credit card which will also function as an electronic pass book, thus familiarising the rural populations with e-payments.

However, the Indian banking system suffers from some defects due to certain socio-cultural factors which hamper the spread of the e-payments culture even though there are many effective electronic payment channels and systems in place. Nearly 63% of all payments are still made in cash. A relatively small percentage of the population pays their bills electronically and most of that population is from urban India. In some cases the transaction is done partially online and partially "offline". The main reason for this apathy to switch to e-payments comes from lack of awareness of the customer despite various efforts by the Government.

References

 
Real-time gross settlement
E-commerce in India
Banking in India